The Ceronda is a  long creek in the Metropolitan City of Turin, Piedmont, region in northwestern Italy.

Geography 
It is formed from several streams that drain the northern slopes of Monte Colombano and converge near Varisella. Flowing from southwest to northeast, it reaches Fiano where it gets out of the Alps and enters into the Po plain turning towards south. After receiving from the right its main tributary, the Casternone, it crosses the Mandria nature park and finally flows into the river Stura di Lanzo in Venaria Reale.

References

Other projects

Tributaries of the Stura di Lanzo
Rivers of the Province of Turin
Rivers of Italy
Rivers of the Alps